Harish Krishnaram Dave (Gujarati: હરીશ કૃષ્ણારામ દવે), better known by his pen name Harish Meenashru (Gujarati: હરીશ મીનાશ્રુ), is a Gujarati language poet and translator from Gujarat, India. He is best known as a postmodern poet in Gujarati literature. Some of his significant works include Dhribaangsundar Eni Pere Dolya (1988), Suno Bhai Sadho (1999), Tandul (1999), Parjanyasukta (1999), and Banaras Diary (2016). His poems have been translated in Hindi, Marathi, Malayalam, Kannada, German, and English. He received a Kalapi Award (2010), Vali Gujarati Gazal Award (2012), and Narsinh Mehta Award (2014). He received the 2020 Sahitya Akademi Award for his poetry collection Banaras Diary (2016).

Life 
Meenashru was born on 3 January 1953 in Anand, Gujarat, India. He studied at Dadabhai Navroji (DN) High School, Anand, from 1962 to 1969. He earned a B. Sc. in Chemistry from V. P. Science College, Vallabh Vidhyanagar from 1969 to 1970, and M. B. at Patel Science College, Anand, from 1970 to 1973. He received a M. Sc. from the Department of Chemistry of the Sardar Patel University in 1975.

Meenashru started his career recruited by the Bank of Baroda in March 1977. He headed a few branches of this bank and retired voluntarily in March 2001 as a senior manager of Amul Dairy Road branch, Anand.

He married Geeta Dave on 30 May 1977. Their son, Tirath, was born in 1979. He lives in Bakrol village, Anand.

Works 
Meenashru wrote his first poem in fifth standard. In 1974, his poem, Chadiyanu Dukaalgeet, was first published in Nootan Shikshan, a magazine edited by Gunvant Shah.

Dhribaangsundar Eni Pere Dolya, his first anthology of poems, was published in 1988, followed by Tambul (1999), Tandul (1999), Parjanyasukta (1999), Suno Bhai Sadho (1999), Pad Pranjali (2004), Pankhipadarath (2011), Shabadman Jinkun Khas Khabaran Padi, (2011), and Banaras Diary (2016).

Nakhasikh (1977), a compilation of selected modern Gujarati ghazals, and Shesh-Vishesh (1984) are two of his compilations. Some of his poems have been edited and translated into English by Piyush Joshi as A Tree with a Thousand Wings (2008).

He has also translated world poetry. He has translated into Gujarati the poems of eighth-century Chinese poet Wang Wei and Nicaraguan poet Pablo Antonio Cuadra. Some of the translated poems are published as Deshatan (Translations of World Poetry) and Hampinā Khadako (2014; translation of poetry of Kannada poet, Chandrashekhara Kambara).

Criticism
Dileep Jhaveri praised him in Muse India (Issue 68: Jul–Aug 2016):

Awards and recognitions

See also
 List of Gujarati-language writers

References

External links

Modernist writers
1953 births
Living people
Indian male poets
Gujarati-language writers
Poets from Gujarat
Gujarati-language poets
People from Anand district
Recipients of the Sahitya Akademi Prize for Translation